The dissolution of the Russian Empire was the process of internal disintegration within the Russian Empire (Russia) which resulted in the end of the country's and its monarchy's existence.

 Independence of Finland
 Treaty on the Creation of the Union of Soviet Socialist Republics

Further reading
 Edmund A. Walsh. "The Fall of the Russian Empire: The End of the Monarchy". www.theatlantic.com. (FEBRUARY 1928 ISSUE) ISBN 9781494097554
 Philip Longworth. "Russia's Empires Their Rise and Fall: from Prehistory to Putin". John Murray, 2005 ISBN 9780719562044
 Pavel Miliukov. "The Russian Revolution".

 
History of the Russian Empire
1980s in the Soviet Union
1922 in the Soviet Union
1922 in politics
1922 in Russia
1922 in international relations
Russian Empire